Events in the year 2012 in Gabon.

Incumbents 

 President: Ali Bongo Ondimba
 Prime Minister: Paul Biyoghé Mba (until 27 February), Raymond Ndong Sima (from 27 February)

Events 

 12 February – The 2012 Africa Cup of Nations final was played at the Stade d'Angondjé in Libreville.

Deaths

References 

 
2010s in Gabon
Years of the 21st century in Gabon
Gabon